Loughman (LOFF-mǝn) is a census-designated place (CDP) in the northeast corner of Polk County, Florida, United States, near the Osceola county line. The population was 1,385 at the 2000 census. It is part of the Lakeland–Winter Haven Metropolitan Statistical Area. This area has grown rapidly since 2000 due, in large part, to its proximity to Walt Disney World and the Orlando, Florida area.

Geography
Loughman is located at  (28.246002, −81.568470).

History 
Loughman was settled shortly after the South Florida Railroad reached the area in 1883.  The place was originally named Lake Locke.

Loughman was on the route of the Dixie Highway, which ran parallel to the line of US 17/92 and was renamed Old Kissimmee Road (although it is named Old Tampa Highway north of the Osceola County line). A monument dated 1930 marks the Polk county line.  Nearby, some of the brick-paved highway remains.

Demographics

As of the census of 2000, there were 1,385 people, 546 households, and 369 families residing in the CDP. The racial makeup of the CDP was 80.65% White, 13.14% African American, 0.07% Native American, 0.51% Asian, 3.83% from other races, and 1.81% from two or more races. Hispanic or Latino of any race were 10.47% of the population.

There were 546 households, out of which 25.6% had children under the age of 18 living with them, 52.9% were married couples living together, 10.4% had a female householder with no husband present, and 32.4% were non-families. 23.8% of all households were made up of individuals, and 6.8% had someone living alone who was 65 years of age or older. The average household size was 2.54 and the average family size was 3.00.

In the CDP, the population was spread out, with 23.7% under the age of 18, 7.1% from 18 to 24, 29.5% from 25 to 44, 23.6% from 45 to 64, and 16.0% who were 65 years of age or older. The median age was 38 years. For every 100 females, there were 96.2 males. For every 100 females age 18 and over, there were 100.6 males.

The median income for a household in the CDP was $31,445, and the median income for a family was $34,063. Males had a median income of $20,160 versus $15,565 for females. The per capita income for the CDP was $14,205. About 14.0% of families and 18.0% of the population were below the poverty line, including 39.0% of those under age 18 and 6.6% of those age 65 or over.

Transportation 
Loughman is on U.S. Highway 17/92, at the junction with Poinciana Parkway (opened in 2016) and Ronald Reagan Parkway (County Road 54).

Bus service is provided by Citrus Connection from Loughman to Posner Park (with connections to Haines City and Four Corners).

References 

Census-designated places in Polk County, Florida
Populated places established in 1883
Census-designated places in Florida